The 2005 British motorcycle Grand Prix was the ninth round of the 2005 MotoGP Championship. It took place on the weekend of 22–24 July 2005 at the Donington Park circuit. It was also marked the final victory of Valentino Rossi in the wet race at the British circuit until the 2015 event was held at the Silverstone Circuit.

MotoGP classification

250 cc classification

125 cc classification
The race, scheduled to be run for 25 laps, was stopped after 7 full laps due to heavy rain. It was later restarted for 9 laps, with the grid determined by the running order before the suspension. The second part of the race determined the final result.

Championship standings after the race (motoGP)

Below are the standings for the top five riders and constructors after round nine has concluded.

Riders' Championship standings

Constructors' Championship standings

 Note: Only the top five positions are included for both sets of standings.

References

British motorcycle Grand Prix
British
Motorcycle Grand Prix